Robinson Crusoe Island is a tourism operation located off the southwest coast of the main island of Viti Levu, Fiji, and has a history dating back 3,500 years. The island is located near Bourewa, an area that is believed is to be the first site for human settlement in Fiji. A pottery site found on the island has been dated back to 1500 BC. Prior to resort development, Likuri Island was reserved as a location for significant ceremonies and Chiefly gatherings. The traditional owner of Likuri Island is the High Chief, Ka Levu Tui Nadroga and the chiefly family.

The resort offers natural and traditional accommodation. The arrangement between the Australians and Fijians is based on the traditional systems of agreement, and allows the visitation of a limited number of tourists seeking a more authentic experience of the Coral Coast and its historically significant culture. The operations of the resort therefore follow strict, eco-sustainable guidelines in regards to resource use and the prevention of pollution.

It requires a short drive south of Nadi and a brief boat trip, as it is close to the coral coastline. Overnight stays, day trips, meals, and entertainment tours are available from many resorts and the island features a unique tribal fire dance distinctive to the island's natural heritage. These trips are also available from Nadi and Denarau Island.

The island is more recently named after the story of Robinson Crusoe after a sailing yacht was wrecked on the nearby reef and the captain and his cat (coincidentally named Friday) took refuge on the island. The island is located in the estuary of the Tuva River, and coral reefs surround the island's seaside exposure, accessed by boat and abundant in Pacific fish and coral, with snorkeling and scuba diving being frequent activities. On the landslide exposure, the island has some mangrove forests, and at its extremities curious soft sand bars and a lagoon bearing into the Pacific Ocean.

Canoes are always available for further exploration and the close relationship with local villagers allows the opportunity for mainland visits to schools, church services, and other local events.

See also

 List of islands

References

Islands of Fiji
Viti Levu